= GM LT4 engine =

General Motors has produced two different engines called LT4:

- 1996–1997 LT4, a Chevrolet small-block engine
- 2015–(current) LT4, a General Motors LS-based small-block engine
